{|
|}

The L-class blimps were training airships operated by the United States Navy during World War II. In the mid-1930s, the Goodyear Aircraft Company built a family of small non-rigid airships that the company used for advertising the Goodyear name. In 1937 the United States Navy awarded a contract for two different airships, K-class blimp designated K-2 and a smaller blimp based upon Goodyear's smaller commercial model airship used for advertising and passenger carrying. The smaller blimp was designated by the Navy as L-1. It was delivered in April 1938 and operated from the Navy's lighter-than-air facility at Lakehurst, New Jersey. In the meantime, the Navy ordered two more L-Class blimps, the L-2 and L-3, on September 25, 1940. These were delivered in 1941. L-2 was lost in a nighttime mid-air collision with the G-1 on June 8, 1942.

When the United States entered World War II, the Navy took over the operation of Goodyear's five commercial blimps. These were the Resolute, Enterprise, Reliance, Rainbow, and Ranger. These airships were given the designations L-4 through L-8 even though their characteristics and performance varied among them. The next four L-Class airships were built in the assembly and repair shops at NAS Moffett Field. These blimps, L-9 through L-12 were completed by April 1943. The last lot of L-Class airships were ordered from Goodyear under a contract of February 24, 1943. This was a lot of ten airships designated L-13 through L-22. All the blimps were delivered by the end of 1943.

As training airships these blimps operated mainly from the two major lighter-than-air bases, Lakehurst and Moffett Field. While too small for any extensive operational use, they were used on some coastal patrols. In this role, L-8, of Blimp Squadron ZP-32 was involved in a mysterious incident wherein the airship came drifting in from the Pacific Ocean over southern San Francisco at Daly City on August 16, 1942, without either of the crewmen – Lt. E. D. Cody and Ensign C. Adams – on board. No trace of either man was ever found.

Following the end of World War II a number of the L-class blimps were sold back to Goodyear. The company repaired L-8 and renamed it America.

Operators 

United States Navy

Surviving aircraft 
 L-5 – Control car on static display at the Udvar-Hazy Center of the National Air and Space Museum in Chantilly, Virginia.
 L-8 – Control car on static display at the National Naval Aviation Museum in Pensacola, Florida.

Specifications (L-4)

See also
List of people who disappeared
US Navy airships during World War II

References

Sources

 
 Engelmann, Larry (July 1978) Close Encounter of Flight 101 American Legion Magazine

External links 

An account of the L-8 mystery



1930s United States military trainer aircraft
1940s missing person cases
Airships of the United States Navy
Aviation accidents and incidents in the United States in 1942
Goodyear aircraft